These are the Official Charts Company's UK Indie Chart number-one singles of 2015.

Chart history

Notes
 – The single was simultaneously number-one on the singles chart.

Number-one Indie artists

See also
List of UK Dance Chart number-one singles of 2015
List of UK R&B Chart number-one singles of 2015
List of UK Rock Chart number-one singles of 2015
List of UK Indie Chart number-one albums of 2015

References

External links
Indie Singles Top 40 at the Official Charts Company
UK Top 30 Indie Singles Chart at BBC Radio 1

2015 in British music
United Kingdom Indie Singles
Indie 2015